Darceta is a genus of moths of the family Noctuidae.

Species
 Darceta falcata Druce, 1883
 Darceta grandimacula Schaus, 1921
 Darceta haenschi Dohrn, 1906
 Darceta ophideres Draudt, 1919
 Darceta primulina Druce, 1889
 Darceta proserpina Stoll, [1782]
 Darceta severa Stoll, [1782]

References
 Darceta at Markku Savela's Lepidoptera and Some Other Life Forms
 Natural History Museum Lepidoptera genus database

Agaristinae